The 1984–85 Ohio Bobcats men's basketball team represented Ohio University as a member of the Mid-American Conference in the college basketball season of 1984–85. The team was coached by Danny Nee in his fifth season at Ohio. They played their home games at Convocation Center. The Bobcats finished with a record of 22–8 and won the MAC regular season championship with a conference record of 14–4.  They won the MAC tournament with wins over Kent State and Miami (OH).  They received a bid to the NCAA tournament. There they lost to Kansas in the first round.

Schedule

|-
!colspan=9 style=|Non-conference regular season

|-
!colspan=12 style=| MAC regular season

|-
!colspan=9 style=| MAC Tournament

|-
!colspan=9 style=| NCAA Tournament

Source:

Statistics

Team Statistics
Final 1984–85 Statistics

Source

Player statistics

Source

References

Ohio Bobcats men's basketball seasons
Ohio
Ohio
Ohio Bobcats men's basketball
Ohio Bobcats men's basketball